Qikiqtarjuaq Airport  is located at Qikiqtarjuaq, Nunavut, Canada, and is operated by the government of Nunavut.

This airport is a popular stop for pilots ferrying turboprop aircraft between Canada and Europe. It is considerably closer to Greenland (Kangerlussuaq Airport) than is Iqaluit Airport. Jet fuel is available from the airport fuel supplier. Avgas may be available from the town council, but this needs to be confirmed in advance.

One instrument approach is available, an NDB or GNSS circling approach. Approach minimums are higher than average ( MSL,  AGL) due to high terrain in the area. The runway is listed as gravel-surfaced, but is in fact a mixture of very firmly packed fine sand and gravel that has a surface texture similar to asphalt. A large overnight parking area is available, but crew must bring their own tie-down anchors. An airport advisory service, Qikiqtarjuaq Airport Radio, a Community Airport Radio Station (CARS), provides assistance to pilots during normal business hours, and provides weather observation services. An automatic weather observation service (AWOS) operates when Qikiqtarjuaq Radio is unattended. The fuel supplier at the airport can assist with all ground handling arrangements, including transportation, parking, de-icing, and accommodations. 

Qikiqtarjuaq is the destination of the eponymous episode of Cabin Pressure, a BBC radio sit-com set in a one-aircraft airline.

Airlines and destinations

References

External links

 Airport fuel supplier
 Instrument Approach Plate (Canada Air Pilot)

Airports in the Arctic
Certified airports in the Qikiqtaaluk Region